Invictus is the debut solo effort from longtime Nile drummer-percussionist George Kollias. The self-produced record was released in 2015 through Season of Mist. Whilst playing the bulk of the instruments himself, he included various guest cameos by popular underground metal artists, such as Nile bandmates Dallas Toler-Wade and Karl Sanders, as well as Firewind guitarist/keyboardist Bob Katsionis.

Track listing
All songs written and arranged by George Kollias.
"Echoes of Divinity" (1:12)
"Invictus" (6:14)
"The Passage" (3:40)
"Aeons of Burning Galaxies" (5:19)
"Shall Rise/Shall Be Dead" (5:33)
"Voices" (6:39)
"Treasures of Nemesis" (5:35)
"Apocalypse" (3:58)
"Epitaph" (4:31)
"Through Empty Eyes of Light" (6:06)
"Buried Under the Flames" (6:09)

Bonus tracks
"Aeons of Burning Galaxies" (R. Cooley Shred Version) 5:19
"Voices (Etfhimis Karadimas Vox Version) 6:41
"Epitaph" (drum track only) 4:13
"Apocalypse" (Andras Trapalis violin version) 3:55

Personnel
George Kollias: Rhythm Guitars, Lead Guitar (track 9), Keyboards, Synthesizers, Bass, Drums, Percussion, Vocals
Rusty Cooley: Lead Guitar on track 4 and bonus track 1
Dallas Toler-Wade: Lead Guitar on track 2
Yiannis Papadopoulos (musician): Lead Guitar on tracks 3 and 10
Mike Breazeale: Speech and Spoken Word on track 1
George Emmanuel: Lead Guitar on track 5
Karl Sanders: Lead Guitar on track 6
Theodore Ziras: Lead Guitar on track 7
Bob Katsionis: Lead Guitar on track 8
Mike Papadopolous: Lead Guitar on track 11

2015 debut albums
George Kollias (drummer) albums
Season of Mist albums